Appeal Isimirie is a Nigerian taekwondo practitioner who competes in the women's senior category. She won a bronze medal at the 2003 African Taekwondo Championships in the –59 kg category.

Sports career 
At the 2003 African Taekwondo Championships held in Abuja, Nigeria. Appeal Isimirie competed and won a silver medal in the 59 kg event.

References 

Year of birth missing (living people)
Living people
Nigerian female taekwondo practitioners
21st-century Nigerian women